Petersburg High School may refer to:

Petersburg High School (Alaska) in Petersburg, Alaska
Petersburg High School (Texas) in Petersburg, Texas
Petersburg High School (Virginia) in Petersburg, Virginia
Petersburg High School (West Virginia) in Petersburg, West Virginia

See also
 St. Petersburg High School in St. Petersburg, Florida